Anne Leahy was a New Zealand archaeologist, active from 1949 to 1995.

Biography 

Photographs by Leahy of excavations, and the items discovered during them, are held in the collections of the University of Auckland and the Auckland War Memorial Museum.

Publications 

 Leahy, A., (1963). An earthwork in Fiji. New Zealand Archeological Association Newsletter 6(1): 17–18.
Leahy, A. and Nicholls E.M. (1964). The Poor Knights Islands. New Zealand Archeological Association Newsletter 7: 99–109.
 Leahy, A. (1970). Excavations at site N38/30, Motutapu Island, New Zealand Auckland Institute and Museum
Leah, A., (1971). Prliminary report and carbon 14 datings on site N44/69, Hot Water Beach, Coromandel. New Zealand Archaeological Association Newsletter 14(2): 62–63.
Leahy, A. and Walsh W., (1980). Field recording in the Waiapu and Tapuaeroa valleys, East Coast. New Zealand Archaeological Association Newsletter 23:121-24.
Leahy, A. and Walsh W., (1982). Site surveying in the eastern Bay of Plenty. New Zealand Archaeological Association Newsletter 25:6-15.
Leahy, A., (1986) Excavations at site 38/140 Motutapu Island, Auckland. New Zealand Archaeological Association Newsletter 29(3):160-166.
Leahy, A. (1991). Excavations at Taylor's Hill, R11/96, Auckland. Records of the Auckland Institute and Museum, 28, 33–68.

References

New Zealand archaeologists
New Zealand women archaeologists
Academic staff of the University of Auckland
Possibly living people
Year of birth missing